Eugene Raymond Ellefson (September 18, 1922 – October 7, 1994) was an American professional basketball player. He was a 6'8" 230 lb forward and attended West Texas A&M University, Oklahoma A&M University, the University of Colorado, and Oklahoma State University.

Ellefson played for the NBA's Minneapolis Lakers and New York Knicks from 1948 to 1951, averaging 1.0 points and 1.3 rebounds per game.

BAA/NBA career statistics

Regular season

References

External links

NBL stats @ basketball-reference.com

1922 births
1994 deaths
Basketball players from South Dakota
Colorado Buffaloes men's basketball players
Minneapolis Lakers players
New York Knicks players
Oklahoma State Cowboys basketball players
Power forwards (basketball)
Waterloo Hawks players
Wilkes-Barre Barons players
American men's basketball players